Hillsong may refer to:

Churches
 Hillsong Church, a church in Sydney, New South Wales, Australia and global headquarters
 Hillsong Brisbane
 Hillsong Church Kiev
 Hillsong NYC
 Hillsong Church UK

Music
 Hillsong musicians
 Hillsong Global Project, musical project by Hillsong Music Australia working with various Hillsong Church campuses around the world
 Hillsong Music Australia, music produced by Hillsong Church
 Hillsong United, Australian band that originated as a part of Hillsong Church, formed in 1998
 Hillsong United: Live in Miami, eleventh live album/DVD by contemporary Christian worship band Hillsong United
 Hillsong Young & Free, Australian contemporary worship music group from Sydney, Australia, where they started making Christian music in 2012
 Hillsong Worship, Australian band that originated as a part of Hillsong Church, formed in 1983

Television
 Hillsong Channel, an American and Australian Christian-based broadcast television network

Others
 Hillsong International Leadership College, in Baulkham Hills, New South Wales, Australia
 Hillsong: Let Hope Rise, a 2016 documentary about Hillsong United
 Shan'ge, Chinese hill songs

See also
Mountain song (disambiguation)